Lichen verrucosus et reticularis is a cutaneous condition that may be related to keratosis lichenoides chronica.

See also 
List of cutaneous conditions

References 

Lichenoid eruptions